Napton and Stockton railway station was a railway station on the London and North Western Railway branch line between Weedon and Leamington Spa.

The station was built of wood and opened on 1 August 1895. It had two platforms, one having the main station facilities and the other being on a passing loop.

British Railways withdrew passenger traffic on 15 September 1958 and freight services on 2 December 1963.

No trace of the station now remains, as the cutting where it was located has been filled in. Although some former railway workers cottages are nearby.

References

External links
 Napton and Stockton on navigable 1954 O. S. map
 Napton and Stockton Station on Warwickshire Railways
 LNWR Map

Disused railway stations in Warwickshire
Railway stations in Great Britain opened in 1895
Railway stations in Great Britain closed in 1958
Former London and North Western Railway stations